Tasu or Tassoo, also Old Tasu or Old Tasu Townsite, was an iron and copper (w/ precious metal sweeteners) open pit and underground mining operation and townsite located on the south shore of Tasu Sound in west-central Moresby Island in the Queen Charlotte Islands of the North Coast of British Columbia, Canada. It ran from 1918 until the early 1980s, with the townsite growing full size in the early 1960s. The early iron mine was owned and worked by Japanese miners, with the mine finishing operation as Wesfrob Mine, owned by Falconbridge Nickel Mines.

The Phyllis Cormack, a seiner, pulled into Tasu on its 1969 Greenpeace run to the Amchitka nuclear test.

See also
 Tasu Water Aerodrome
 Gold Harbour, British Columbia

References

Photo gallery of Tasu Sound townsite
BC Govt MINFILE Record Summary, Tasu or Tassoo
BC Govt MINFILE Mineral Inventory, Tasu Townsite

Mining communities in British Columbia
Company towns in Canada
Ghost towns in British Columbia
Populated places in Haida Gwaii